Elvira Wood may refer to:

 Elvira Wood (paleontologist) (1865–1928), American paleontologist 
 Elvira Wood (fencer), South African fencer